Mantrap or man trap may refer to:

Devices
 Mantrap (access control), a double-door single-person access control space
 Mantrap (snare), a mechanical device for catching trespassers

Entertainment

Films
Mantrap (1926 film), a silent film based on the Sinclair Lewis novel
The Mantrap, a 1943 American mystery film directed by George Sherman
Mantrap (1953 film), a British whodunit film directed by Terence Fisher
Man-Trap, a 1961 American film directed by Edmond O'Brien

Television
"The Man Trap", a 1966 episode of the television series Star Trek
"Man Trap", a 1986 episode of the BBC television sitcom Hi-de-Hi!
"Mantrap" (The Adventures of Black Beauty), a 1972 episode of the British television series Adventures of Black Beauty

Other entertainment
Mantrap (novel), a 1926 novel by Sinclair Lewis

Places
Mantrap Lake, a lake in Minnesota, U.S.
Mantrap Township, Hubbard County, Minnesota, a township in Minnesota, U.S.